Shiva Sutras are a collection of seventy seven aphorisms that form the foundation of the tradition of spiritual mysticism known as Kashmir Shaivism. They are attributed to the sage Vasugupta of the 9th century C.E.

Vasugupta is said to have lived near Mahadeva Mountain in the valley of the Harvan stream behind what are now the Shalimar Gardens near Srinagar. One myth is that he received the aphorisms in a dream visitation of a Siddha or semi-divine being. Another is that Lord Shiva came to him in a dream and instructed him to go to a certain rock on which he would find the teachings inscribed. This rock called Shankaropala is still visited by devotees. The other theory is that Lord Shiva taught the Siva-Sutras to Vasugupta in a dream. Whatever the truth is these myths point to the traditional belief that the Shiva sutras are of Philosophical origin or revelation and are surely a very great product of Sanatana Dharma.

Historically the Shiva Sutras and the ensuing school of Kashmir Shaivism are a Tantric or Agamic tradition. The Tantrics saw themselves as independent of the Vedic mainstream schools of thought and practice, and as beyond the rules that had been put in place by them.

A number of commentaries were written by Vasugupta's contemporaries or successors. Most famous of them is Kshemaraja's Vimarshini (10th Century C.E.) which has been translated into English by Jaideva Singh and Swami Lakshman Joo. Another is a commentary called the Varttika by Bhaskara (11th century C.E.) which has been translated into English by Dr. Mark Dyczkowski.

There are many translations of the Shiva Sutras into English. A painstaking Italian translation of the Sutras and the Kshemaraja's Vimarshini by Raffaele Torella is also available. Demetrios Th. Vassiliades translated the Shiva Sutras with the Kshemaraja's Vimarshini into Greek. Kriya yogi. The latest most authoritative treatise on the Sutras is by Gerard D. C. Kuiken.

The Fifth Guru of Kriya yoga (Babaji's lineage), Shailendra Sharma gave yogic commentaries to Shiva Sutras in 1993.
In 2014 new translation of Shiva Sutras into English has been made available along with innovative commentary organized into chapters called cascades 

The soul power of Shiva Sutras of Vasugupta is that the yogi experiences both internal and external awareness of the Divine. His consciousness transcends into sublime awareness of each minute particle of the universe so that all the seemingly mystic to others seems totally innate to him.

See also
 Shiva Sutras

Bibliography

References

External links
Siva Sutras in UTF-8
The Commentary on Shiva Sutras by Shailendra Sharma
Shiva Sutras with Cascading Commentary

Shaiva texts
9th-century books
Sanskrit texts
Kashmir Shaivism